The 2021–22 Melbourne Renegades season was the eleventh in the club's history. Coached by David Saker and captained by Nic Maddinson, they  competed in the BBL's 2021–22 season.

Standings

Fixtures and results

Pre-season

Home and away season

Squad information

The current squad of the Melbourne Renegades for the 2021–22 Big Bash League season as of 19 January 2022.
 Players with international caps are listed in bold.

Administration and support staff
The current administration and support staff of the Melbourne Renegades for the 2021–22 Big Bash League season as of 29 November 2021.

Season statistics

Home attendance

References

External links
 Official website of the Melbourne Renegades
 Official website of the Big Bash League

Melbourne Renegades seasons
2021–22 Australian cricket season